The intraparietal sulcus (IPS) is located on the lateral surface of the parietal lobe, and consists of an oblique and a horizontal portion.  The IPS contains a series of functionally distinct subregions that have been intensively investigated using both single cell neurophysiology in primates and human functional neuroimaging.
Its principal functions are related to perceptual-motor coordination (e.g., directing eye movements and reaching) and visual attention, which allows for visually-guided pointing, grasping, and object manipulation that can produce a desired effect.

The IPS is also thought to play a role in other functions, including processing symbolic numerical information, visuospatial working memory  and interpreting the intent of others.

Function
Five regions of the intraparietal sulcus (IPS): anterior, lateral, ventral, caudal, and medial
 LIP & VIP: involved in visual attention and saccadic eye movements
 VIP & MIP: visual control of reaching and pointing
 AIP: visual control of grasping and manipulating hand movements
 CIP: perception of depth from stereopsis

All of these areas have projections to the frontal lobe for executive control.

Activity in the intraparietal sulcus has also been associated with the learning of sequences of finger movements.

The dorsal attention network includes the intraparietal sulcus of each hemisphere. The intraparietal sulcus is activated during voluntary orientation of attention.

Understanding numbers
Behavioral studies suggest that the IPS is associated with impairments of basic numerical magnitude processing and that there is a pattern of structural and functional alternations in the IPS and in the PFC in dyscalculia. Children with developmental dyscalculia were found to have less gray matter in the left IPS.

Studies have shown that electrical activity in a particular group of nerve cells in the intraparietal sulcus spiked when, and only when, volunteers were performing calculations.
Outside experimental settings it was also found that when a patient mentioned a number—or even a quantitative reference, such as "some more", "many" or "bigger than the other one"—there was a spike of electrical activity in the same nerve-cell population of the intraparietal sulcus that was activated when the patient was doing calculations under experimental conditions.

Additional images

References

External links

 Illustrations at ssc.uwo.ca

Sulci (neuroanatomy)
Articles containing video clips
Parietal lobe